Gubden (Dargwa: Губдани) is a rural locality (a selo) and the administrative centre of Gubdensky Selsoviet, Karabudakhkentsky District, Republic of Dagestan, Russia. The population was 2,798 as of 2010. There are 37 streets.

Demography 
Dargins form the majority of the population of Gubden.

History

In the past Gubden was one of the most important settlements of Dagestan.

Geography
Gubden is located 18 km south of Karabudakhkent (the district's administrative centre) by road. Gurbuki and Kadirkent are the nearest rural localities.

Famous residents 
 Yusuf Khadzhi al-Gubdani (scholar and physician)
 Magomed Abdullayev (professor, orientalist, doctor of philosophy)
 Abdulmalik Magomedov (Hero of Russia)
 Nurmagomed Shanavazov (former boxer)
 Abdulnasyr Medzhikov (world champion in muay thai)
 Salimgerey Rasulov (mixed martial arts fighter)
 Darsam Dzhaparov (International Master of Sports of Russia)

References 

Rural localities in Karabudakhkentsky District